Goodfriend is a surname. It may refer to:

David Goodfriend (born 1968), American attorney 
Lynda Goodfriend (born 1953), American actress
Marvin Goodfriend (1950-2019), American professor

It may also refer to:

The bonus disc for the 2006 release of Girlfriend by Matthew Sweet.

See also
Gutfreund

English-language surnames